Stokenbury Cemetery is a historic cemetery on Arkansas Highway 16 in Elkins, Arkansas. Established 1846, it is the best-preserved property representing the early settlement of Elkins (now a bedroom suburb of Fayetteville). It contains several examples of high-style Victorian funerary art.

The cemetery was listed on the National Register of Historic Places in 2010.

See also
 National Register of Historic Places listings in Washington County, Arkansas

References

Cemeteries on the National Register of Historic Places in Arkansas
Victorian architecture in Arkansas
Religious buildings and structures completed in 1846
National Register of Historic Places in Washington County, Arkansas
1846 establishments in Arkansas
Cemeteries established in the 1840s